1099 OID fraud is  a common scam used to obtain money from the U.S. Internal Revenue Service (IRS) by filing false tax refund claims.

Form 1099-OID is intended to be submitted to the IRS by the holder of debt instruments (such as bonds, notes, or certificates) which were discounted at purchase to report the taxable difference between the instruments' actual value and the discounted purchase price. In 1099-OID fraud, the filer of a tax return fills out the form themselves with a false withholding amount and submits it to the IRS in an attempt to reduce tax liability. Promoters of the fraud allege that the withheld amount exists in a secret bank account, a claim that originates from the redemption movement. The IRS initially overlooked the fraud because it lacked time to verify withholding data; however it has since taken notice and responded with both criminal prosecutions and public awareness campaigns.

In one egregious case, Ronald L. Brekke of Orange County, California, was convicted on March 17, 2012, in federal court in Seattle, Washington, of conspiracy and wire fraud in which 1,000 people, most of them Canadian, filed fraudulent United States tax refund claims with the IRS. The scam totaled $763 million, but the IRS paid out only $14 million. Mr. Brekke received $400 thousand from his clients.

References

Tax fraud
Personal taxes in the United States
Fraud in the United States
Confidence tricks